Mohammad Haidhir bin Suhaini (born 29 July 1996) is a Malaysian footballer who plays for Terengganu FC in the Malaysia Super League as a midfielder.

Club career
On 22 October 2016, Haidhir marked his debut and play 31 minutes of a 1–0 loss against Penang in Super League match.

Career statistics
.

References

Malaysian footballers
1996 births
Living people
Association football midfielders
Terengganu FC players